Htar Htet Htet is a Burmese actress, gymnastics instructor and former beauty queen.

Htar represented Myanmar in the first Miss Grand International  beauty pageant in Thailand in 2013. She has been named the winner of the Miss Popular Award at the first-ever Miss Grand International 2013  beauty contest in Bangkok, Thailand. She is the latest of a string of Burmese beauty contestants to win recognition in international competitions.

Early life and education

Htar Htet Htet  was born on 19 December 1989 in the Kalay, Myanmar. Her father, Dr.Kyaw Moe and her mother is Tin Tin Swe. She is the youngest of four siblings.

Pageantry

She represented Myanmar at the Miss Grand International 2013  pageant which was held in Thailand, competing against 80 contenders in swimsuit and national costume rounds.She was placed in the top 20 and won Miss Popular Award.

Career
Htar Htet Htet started her acting career in 2014, after the competition in Miss Grand International 2013. She made her acting debut with the Burmese film Diary of a villain, where she played the leading role with an actor Lu Min and Yone Lay, directed by Thar Nyi , and which screened in Myanmar cinemas on 17 August 2018. However,  due to the Myanmar coup d'état on 1 February, she fled from Yangoon in late April 2021 to start the military training with Karen National Defence Organisation (KNDO) as well as the United Defense Force (UDF) which was made up of protesters against the coup, and later joined the ethnic rebels in Myanmar's border regions to take up arms against the country's military leaders.

Filmography

 Diary of a villain (2018)
 Special Force
 25%
Ayuu Taw Mingalar

References

External links

1989 births
Living people
Burmese beauty pageant winners
Burmese film actresses
Burmese female models
21st-century Burmese actresses
People from Yangon
Miss Grand Myanmar
Miss Grand International contestants